Andreas Schrott (born 24 August 1981) is an Austrian football manager and former player.

In 2014, he left Liefering and joined FC Wacker Innsbruck as assistant coach.

References

Austrian footballers
Austrian Football Bundesliga players
Grazer AK players
FC Wacker Innsbruck (2002) players
FC Admira Wacker Mödling players
FC Liefering players
1989 births
Living people
Association football defenders
People from Hall in Tirol
Footballers from Tyrol (state)
WSG Tirol players
FC Wacker Innsbruck (2002) managers
FC Tirol Innsbruck players